Nino Lombardo (died 7 October 2018) was an Italian politician who served as a Deputy from 1976 to 1994.

References

Date of birth missing
People from Paternò
2018 deaths
Politicians from the Province of Catania
Deputies of Legislature VII of Italy
Deputies of Legislature VIII of Italy
Deputies of Legislature IX of Italy
Deputies of Legislature X of Italy
Deputies of Legislature XI of Italy